Forest Citys may refer to:
Forest City, an American professional baseball team that played in Cleveland, Ohio, from 1870 to 1872, today generally referred to as the Cleveland Forest Citys
Forest City, an American professional baseball team that played in Rockford, Illinois, in 1871, today generally referred to as the Rockford Forest Citys

See also
Forest City